Raith may refer to:

People 
 Robert Ferguson of Raith (1769–1840), Scottish politician
 John Melville of Raith (died 1548), Scottish laird executed for treason
 Julius Raith (1819–1862), German-American military officer
 Sissy Raith (born 1960), German female association footballer
 Thomas Raith, fictional vampire in the contemporary fantasy series The Dresden Files by Jim Butcher

Other uses 
 Ráith, an Irish word for ringfort
 Raith, Fife, one-time area of Fife
 Raith, Ontario, a dispersed rural community and unincorporated area
 Raith Rovers F.C., a Scottish association football club based in the town of Kirkcaldy, Fife
 Ràth, a Scottish Gaelic term for a fort or fortified residence, particularly one surrounded by an earthen rampart, featuring in many placenames, including a major road interchange (M74 / A725) in South Lanarkshire

See also 
 John Jeremiah McRaith (1934–2017), American prelate of the Roman Catholic Church
 Battle of Raith, a theory regarding the site of the Battle of Catraeth, now largely dismissed